The Scotland national indoor lacrosse team represents Scotland at box lacrosse. It is governed by Lacrosse Scotland.

Scotland national indoor lacrosse team history

The inaugural World Indoor Lacrosse Championship (WILC) was held in Hamilton, Kitchener, Mississauga, and Oshawa, Ontario, Canada in May 2003. National teams from Australia, Canada, the Czech Republic, the Iroquois Nation, Scotland and the United States participated. The World Indoor Lacrosse Championship was sponsored by the International Lacrosse Federation through 2007. The team attended the second championship in 2007. The championship is now sponsored by World Lacrosse (formally the Federation of International Lacrosse). The Box (Indoor) lacrosse program within Scotland and the Scotland national indoor lacrosse team was reformed in 2018 after not attending the 2011 and 2015 World Indoor Lacrosse Championships. 

The team as of 2021 is under the management of Brendan Cook (general manager), Mike Simpson (head coach), Bob Heyes (assistant coach) and Dylan Cowman (assistant coach) . Trials are currently underway for the European Indoor Lacrosse Championships 2021 in Hanover, Germany.

World Indoor Lacrosse Championships 2019 
The team as of 2018 was under the management of Brendan Cook (general manager), Brian Witmer (head coach) and Navi Mahal (assistant coach). The team attended the European Box lacrosse invitational (EBox) in 2018 and again in 2019. The team attended the World Indoor Lacrosse Championships 2019 in Langley, Canada and finished 16th out of 20 teams having been seeded at 16th. The national team roster is posted below.

ILF World Indoor Championships history

2019 World Championship 

Playoffs: 
Scotland vs Hong Kong (12–10 Win)
Scotland vs Australia (5–29 Loss)
Scotland vs Slovakia (12–14 Loss)
Scotland vs Sweden (9–18 Loss)

16th Place overall finish

2007 World Championship 

 			
Quarter-finals: 18 May 2007 - England defeated Australia 15-11; USA defeated Scotland 17-9
						
Fifth Place Match: 19 May 2007 - Scotland defeated Australia 14-8

2003 World Championship 

				
Semi-finals: 22 May 2003 - Canada defeated USA 17-9; Iroquois Nationals defeated Scotland 22-8

Bronze Medal Match: 24 May 2003 - USA defeated Scotland 15-9

External links
 World Indoor Lacrosse Championship website
 International Lacrosse Federation

Scotland men's
Lacrosse
National lacrosse teams